Heart Don't Lie is the third album released by American singer-songwriter La Toya Jackson. Released in 1984 by Epic Records, this album is her most critically acclaimed and commercially successful album to date, peaking at #149 on the Billboard 200 and #65 on the Top Black Albums chart.

Album information 
The album was produced by Amir Bayyan, brother of Khalis Bayyan and Robert Bell, and member of Kool & the Gang, who was hired after Joe Jackson, La Toya's father and then-manager, heard his tapes. Jackson recorded the album sporadically over a six-month period. The album features a plethora of musical guests, including Shalamar's Howard Hewett and reggae-pop group Musical Youth on the title track, musicians from Kool & the Gang on several tracks throughout the album, and collaborations with her siblings, including Marlon, Janet, and Tito, who co-produced the track "Frustration".

Jackson and Bayyan originally wrote the song "Reggae Nights" for this album, but it ended up being a Grammy-nominated single for Jimmy Cliff. Said Jackson at the time, "A lot of people wanted to sing that tune and we were thinking about saving it for my album. But when Jimmy came along I said, 'Forget it. I hear a guy doing it.' So he got the tune." She recorded the song herself for her 1991 album No Relations.

Heart Don't Lie was re-released by Funky Town Grooves on CD in February 2012. The expanded edition included 7 bonus tracks. As of January 2013, the album is once again out of print.

Reception 

The Afro-American described the opening "Think Twice" as a "rocker" and compared "Hot Potato" to an Evelyn King song. The LP's A-side closes with a cover Prince's "Private Joy" with which Jackson, according to the LA Times "matches Prince's intensity with her own hard-edged snap, crackle and pop." Dave Marsh of Rolling Stone described the album as "the one Jackson record you don't hear on the radio", which, "given the all-encompassing aura of the phenomenon [...] ought to give you a strong sense of the banality of what's stored in this set of grooves." Chris Albertson of Stereo Review said that "judging by [this album], producer Amir Bayyan is aware of her limitations—at least, that would account for
his drowning her voice in some very strong, rhythmic arrangements. This is an eminently forgettable release."

Many consider this to be Jackson's finest musical effort, with Allmusic commenting that there are

Track listing

Expanded edition

Charts

References

1984 albums
La Toya Jackson albums
Epic Records albums
Funk albums by American artists
Reggae albums by American artists